Gunna may refer to:

Gunna (rapper) (born 1993), American rapper, singer, and songwriter, real name Sergio Giavanni Kitchens 
Gunna, Scotland, an unpopulated island in Inner Hebrides
Gunna (comics), a Thunderbolts character
Gunna (film), a 2005 Kannada romance-action-drama
Gunna, New South Wales, Australia, in Leichhardt County
 Gunna Breuning-Storm (1891–1966), Danish violinist and music teacher
  (born 1954), Swedish illustrator